The 13th Asian Athletics Championships were held in Jakarta, Indonesia in late August 2000.

Results

Men

Women

Medals table

Participation

See also
2000 in athletics (track and field)

External links
GBR Athletics
Full results (Internet Archive)

 
Asian Athletics Championships
Asian Championships
Athletics
A
Sport in Jakarta
2000 in Asian sport
August 2000 sports events in Asia